Aristide Bancé (born 19 September 1984) is a Burkinabé former professional footballer who played as a striker.

He started his European career at Lokeren, scoring 27 goals in 87 Jupiler Pro League games. After a season in Ukraine with Metalurh Donetsk, he moved to German club Mainz 05. In his first season at Mainz he helped the club achieve promotion to the Bundesliga with 14 league goals, as well as the semi-finals of the DFB-Pokal, scoring 4 goals in the latter competition. The next season, under Thomas Tuchel, he helped Mainz staying in the German top tier and achieve 9th place by scoring 10 goals in the 2009–10 Bundesliga.

In 2013, Bancé helped his national team to reach the final of the 2013 Africa Cup of Nations, Burkina Faso's greatest achievement in football to date. He scored both the equaliser and the winning kick in the eventual penalty shootout in the semi-final against Ghana. In the  2017 Africa Cup of Nations, he scored the first goal in Burkina Faso's win over Tunisia in the quarter-finals, and in the semi-final scored a late equaliser against Egypt to take the game to a penalty shootout. Burkina Faso lost the shootout and eventually finished third overall in the cup by defeating Ghana in the third place play-off.

Club career

Metalurh Donetsk
On 20 June 2006, Bancé signed for Metalurh Donetsk on a four-year contract.

Having failed to secure a first-team place at Metalurh Donetsk, he returned to Belgium in July 2007, signing for Germinal Beerschot on a year-long loan. However, he was loaned out to Kickers Offenbach in January 2008 for the remainder of the season.

Mainz 05
Bancé joined Mainz 05 on a four-year contract for an undisclosed fee in summer 2008.

Al-Ahli Dubai
On 16 August 2010, Bancé signed for Al-Ahli Dubai on a four-year contract, with the transfer agreement between the two clubs remaining undisclosed.

FC Augsburg
In June 2012, Bancé signed for FC Augsburg on a three-year contract for an undisclosed fee.

In September 2013, he joined Fortuna Düsseldorf on loan until the end of the season.

HJK Helsinki
In September 2014, Bancé signed with Finnish Veikkausliiga side HJK Helsinki.

Irtysh Pavlodar
In February 2015, Bancé signed for Kazakhstan Premier League side FC Irtysh Pavlodar, leaving the club in June of the same year.

Chippa United
In August 2015, Bancé went on trial with Bidvest Wits of the South African Premier Soccer League, eventually signing with Chippa United later in the month. Bancé parted company with Chippa United in May 2016.

Riga
In August 2016, Bancé signed with Virslīga side Riga FC.

ASEC Mimosas
In November 2016, Bancé was confirmed as a new signing for Ivorian side ASEC Mimosas. Bancé was voted player of the month for November 2016.

Al-Masry
In July 2017, Bancé signed a two-year contract with Egyptian Premier League side Al-Masry.

US des Forces Armées
In February 2019, Bancé returned to Burkina Faso to sign for US des Forces Armées.

Horoya AC
In May 2019, Bancé signed for Guinean club Horoya AC, his 22nd team. In October 2019 he scored a hate-trick in the Confederation Cup play-offs.

International career
Bancé is a member of the Burkina Faso national football team. He has appeared for Burkina Faso at three Africa Cup of Nations tournaments, scoring both the team's goal and the winning kick in the penalty shootout in Les Étalons semi-final defeat of Ghana at the 2013 edition to put the nation in the final for first time in its history. Burkina Faso went on to lose the final to Nigeria and finish as runner-up.

At the 2015 Africa Cup of Nations, Bancé scored Burkina Faso's goal in a 2–1 loss to Congo which saw the 2013 runner-up knocked out at the group stage. In 2017, he scored a crucial goal in his team's quarter-final against Tunisia and in the semi-final scored a late equaliser against Egypt to take the game to a penalty shootout. Burkina Faso lost the shootout and eventually finished third overall in the cup, defeating Ghana in the third-place playoff.

In July 2020, Bancé announced his retirement from international football.

Personal life
Bancé was born in Abidjan, Ivory Coast to Burkinabe parents, but moved to Burkina Faso as a child. He is the brother-in-law to professional footballer Aruna Dindane.

Career statistics

International

International goals
Scores and results list Burkina Faso's goal tally first.

HonoursMainzDFB-Pokal semi-finalist: 2008–09
2. Bundesliga runner-up: 2008–09HJKVeikkausliiga: 2014
Finnish Cup: 2014ASEC MimosasLigue 1: 2016–17Al-MasryEgypt Cup runner-up: 2016–17
Egyptian Super Cup runner-up: 2017–18Al-AhliUAE League Cup: 2011–12Burkina Faso Africa Cup of Nations runner-up: 2013; third-place: 2017Individual'
Ligue 1 top scorer: 2016–17 (13 goals)

References

External links
 
 Aristide Bancé at kicker.de 
 Profile and stats - Lokeren 

1984 births
Living people
Citizens of Burkina Faso through descent
Burkinabé footballers
Burkina Faso international footballers
Ivorian footballers
Ivorian people of Burkinabé descent
Sportspeople of Burkinabé descent
Association football forwards
K.S.C. Lokeren Oost-Vlaanderen players
FC Metalurh Donetsk players
Beerschot A.C. players
Kickers Offenbach players
1. FSV Mainz 05 players
Al Ahli Club (Dubai) players
Umm Salal SC players
Samsunspor footballers
FC Augsburg players
Fortuna Düsseldorf players
Stade d'Abidjan players
Santos FC Ouagadougou footballers
Helsingin Jalkapalloklubi players
FC Irtysh Pavlodar players
Chippa United F.C. players
Riga FC players
ASEC Mimosas players
Al Masry SC players
Burkinabé Premier League players
Belgian Pro League players
Bundesliga players
2. Bundesliga players
Ukrainian Premier League players
UAE Pro League players
Qatar Stars League players
Süper Lig players
Veikkausliiga players
Kazakhstan Premier League players
South African Premier Division players
Latvian Higher League players
Egyptian Premier League players
Guinée Championnat National players
Burkinabé expatriate footballers
Ivorian expatriate footballers
Expatriate footballers in Belgium
Expatriate footballers in Germany
Expatriate footballers in Ukraine
Expatriate footballers in Turkey
Expatriate footballers in Finland
Expatriate footballers in the United Arab Emirates
Expatriate footballers in Kazakhstan
Expatriate footballers in Latvia
Expatriate soccer players in South Africa
2012 Africa Cup of Nations players
2013 Africa Cup of Nations players
2015 Africa Cup of Nations players
Ivorian emigrants to Burkina Faso
Footballers from Abidjan
2017 Africa Cup of Nations players
US des Forces Armées players
Horoya AC players
Expatriate footballers in Guinea
Burkinabé expatriate sportspeople in Guinea
Burkinabé expatriate sportspeople in Belgium
Burkinabé expatriate sportspeople in Germany
Burkinabé expatriate sportspeople in Ukraine
Burkinabé expatriate sportspeople in Turkey
Burkinabé expatriate sportspeople in Finland
Burkinabé expatriate sportspeople in the United Arab Emirates
Burkinabé expatriate sportspeople in Kazakhstan
Burkinabé expatriate sportspeople in South Africa
Ivorian expatriate sportspeople in Guinea
Ivorian expatriate sportspeople in Belgium
Ivorian expatriate sportspeople in Germany
Ivorian expatriate sportspeople in Ukraine
Ivorian expatriate sportspeople in Turkey
Ivorian expatriate sportspeople in Finland
Ivorian expatriate sportspeople in the United Arab Emirates
Ivorian expatriate sportspeople in Kazakhstan
Ivorian expatriate sportspeople in South Africa
Ligue 1 (Ivory Coast) players
21st-century Burkinabé people